Kai Remlov (born December 30, 1946) is a Norwegian actor. He has been engaged with the National Theater in Oslo since 1973, including at its Torshov Theater.

He has played over a hundred characters. He played the main role of Roland Marco in NRK's science fiction series Ta den ring from 1982. He has also played Capulet in Romeo and Juliet, Professor Turman in Geografi og Kærlighed (Geography and Love), John in Oleanna, Hjalmar Ekdahl in The Wild Duck, Dec in Gaucho, and Golaud in Pelléas and Mélisande.

Remlov also played Elias Rukla in the one-man performance Genanse og verdighet (Reconciliation and Dignity) for three seasons starting in the fall of 2000. For this interpretation, he received the Scandinavian National Theater Award. He was named Audiobook Voice of the Year in 2002, and he received the Per Aabel Honorary Award in 2007. He also played Santa in the series Jul på Månetoppen (Christmas at the Top of the Moon).

Kai Remlov is the elder brother of the actor and theater director Tom Remlov.

Filmography

1958: Pastor Jarman kommer hjem as Jarman's son
1963: Om Tilla as a teenager
1963: Skjær i sjøen as Carsten, Eva's boyfriend
1970: Ballad of the Masterthief Ole Hoiland as a soldier at Akershus
1981: Zeppelin as the boy's father
1990: Herman as Jacobsen Jr.
1990: The Rescuers Down Under as Krebbs (Norwegian voice)
1995: Hører du ikke hva jeg sier! as Stig's father
1995: Long Live the Queen (Norwegian voice)
1996: Aldri mer 13! as Charlotte's father
1997: Livredd as the publishing consultant
1998: Thranes metode as Mol's husband
1998: Weekend as Kai Strand
2006: Marias Menn as Bernard
2007: O' Horten as Steiner Sissener
2007: Tatt av kvinnen as Slind Hansen
2008: Varg Veum – Begravde hunder as Fredriksen
2010: Home for Christmas as a paramedic
2012: I Belong as Kristian

References

External links
 
 Kai Remlov at the Swedish Film Database
 Kai Remlov at Sceneweb
 Kai Remlov at Filmfront

Living people
1946 births
20th-century Norwegian male actors
21st-century Norwegian male actors
Male actors from Oslo